Mt. Zion Schoolhouse was a historic public school building located at Mount Solon, Augusta County, Virginia. Built in 1876, it was a two-room, rectangular frame building topped by a gable roof. It was moved from its original location to a site near Mt. Zion Church before 1915.  The schoolhouse was sold in 1948, and remodeled into two apartments.

It was listed on the National Register of Historic Places in 1985.

References

School buildings on the National Register of Historic Places in Virginia
School buildings completed in 1876
Schools in Augusta County, Virginia
National Register of Historic Places in Augusta County, Virginia